The Happening Thang was an Australian country pop group formed in 1984 and the founding members were Andrew Travers, Catherine Wearne, Rose Pearse, Stuart Crysell and David Lennon. The band's line-up changed by the time they released their first album, The Happening Thang, in June 1989. Their second album was Saddlepop (1990), released on Trafalgar/WEA. The Happening Thang played their first gig on 19 August 1984 at a private party in Birchgrove - see photo on right featuring (from left to right), Rose Pearse on bass guitar, Dave Lennon on drums, Catherine Wearne on vocals, Andrew Travers on acoustic guitar and lead vocals and (not pictured) Stuart Crysell on guitar.

History 
The Happening Thang was an Australian country pop group formed in Sydney in 1984. The founding members included Andrew Travers (acoustic guitar), Catherine Wearne "Miss Cathy" (lead vocals), Rose Pearse (bass guitar), Stuart Crysell (electric guitar) and Dave Lennon (drums), who were all living under the same roof and also performed in other bands at the same time. 

When the band recorded their first album three years later for Trafalgar Records, the line-up included Rob Souter on drums and Bruce Thorburn on fiddle. Other members up to that time included Ian Simpson or Jenny Shimmin (banjo), Murray Cook (piano), Jim Niven (piano accordion), Reg Mombassa (guitar), Mark Dawson (drums). On Stuart Crysell's departure Jeff Mercer became the guitarist, mandolin and dobro player. David Patterson replaced Rose Pearse on bass guitar and Adrien Warren (USA) on Drums. Kathy Bluff replaced Bruce Thorburn for a tour of Canada in 1989. In 1983 Travers had been in many bands including as drummer for Adelaide-based group, the Spitfires (Rivet Records 1983 - I Was A Teenage Teenager), before he relocated to Sydney with his rockabilly group, the Milky Bar Kids on guitar from 1984 to 1986. While still a member of the Happening Thang, Travers guested on drums on Neil Murray's debut album, Calm and Crystal Clear (April 1989).

Australian musicologist, Ian McFarlane, described how the Happening Thang, "combined Hank Williams-style country roots with pop melodies to produce an uplifting, Australian urban and western sound. Other influences included Gram Parsons, Jimmie Rodgers and early Elvis Presley." They issued their debut single, "I Don't Wanna Go To Work" in February 1989. At the Australasian Country Music Awards, in January of the following year, they won New Talent of the Year for the song. 

Their second single, "Drive Away", appeared in July 1989 and was followed in December by an eponymous album on Trafalgar/WEA. Most of its tracks were written by Travers. For that album the line-up of the group was Mercer, Patterson, Travers and Wearne, which was augmented by additional musicians: Pearse on vocals and bass guitar, Kathy Bluff on fiddle, Murray Cook on piano, Jim Niven on piano accordion, Dave Faulkner on piano, Peter O'Doherty on backing vocals, Ian Simpson on pedal steel guitar, Robert Souter on drums, and Bruce Thorburn on fiddle. At the ARIA Music Awards of 1990 it was nominated for Best Country Album. They appeared on the 1990 compilation album Breaking Ground - New Directions in Country Music which was nominated for the same award in 1991.

The Happening Thang's second album, Saddlepop (1990), provided a single: their cover version of Neil Young's "The Losing End". For this album the group's core members were Michael Kerin on fiddle, Mercer on electric guitar, mandolin, dobro and backing vocals, Patterson on bass guitar and backing vocals, Ross Burge on drums, Travers on lead vocals, electric, rhythm, and acoustic guitars, and Wearne on vocals. They were assisted in the studio by Bluff and Cook; it was co-produced by Rod Coe and the band.

After the group disbanded Travers joined Dog Trumpet, in 1995, on drums, alongside that band's founders O'Doherty on guitar, mandolin and bass guitar, and his brother, Reg Mombassa on guitar and lead vocals. They were joined by Amanda Brown on violin and backing vocals (ex-The Go-Betweens). That line-up issued an album, Suitcase (January 1996).

In the mid-2000s Mercer and Patterson formed a country music group, the Cartwheels, in Hepburn Springs. The line-up included Patterson's wife, Wendy Phypers, on rhythm guitar and vocals, and their son, Charley Phypers, on drums.

In 2014, founding members, Travers and Wearne co-founded The Western Distributors, a country/pop band, with Guy Donnellan and released a 13-track self titled album in March 2018.

Discography

Albums

Singles

Awards and nominations

ARIA Music Awards
The ARIA Music Awards are a set of annual ceremonies presented by Australian Recording Industry Association (ARIA), which recognise excellence, innovation, and achievement across all genres of the music of Australia. They commenced in 1987. 

! 
|-
| 1990 || The Happening Thang || ARIA Award for Best Country Album ||  ||

Country Music Awards of Australia
The Country Music Awards of Australia (CMAA) (also known as the Golden Guitar Awards) is an annual awards night held in January during the Tamworth Country Music Festival, celebrating recording excellence in the Australian country music industry. They have been held annually since 1973.

|-
| 1990
| The Happening Thang
| New Talent of the Year
| 

 Note: wins only

Mo Awards
The Mo Awards is an annual awards night, celebrating excellence in the Australian variety show industry. They have been held annually since 1975.

|-
| 1991
| The Happening Thang
| Country Showgroup
| 
|-
| 1990
| The Happening Thang
| Country Showgroup
| 
|-
| 1989
| The Happening Thang
| Country Showgroup
|

References 

Australian country music groups
Musical groups disestablished in 1991
Musical groups established in 1988
Musical groups from Sydney